Candidatus oeconomices (male) or Candidata oeconomices (female), often abbreviated cand.oecon. is an academic degree in economics at Danish, Icelandic and Norwegian universities. It is roughly equivalent to a Master of Economics.

It was introduced in Norway in 1905 as supplementary academic degree in economics, conferred by the Faculty of Law, University of Oslo and mostly intended for those already holding a cand.jur. degree. The degree cand.oecon. in itself did not qualify for the higher civil servant positions, unlike the cand.jur. degree. The programme usually lasted two years. In 1934, it became an independent 5-year education in economics. The degree was replaced in Norway by the Bachelor/Master's degree (3+2) system in 2003.

It was established in 1964 at the University of Iceland as a 4-year program in Business Administration at the Faculty of Economics and Business Administration and remained in effect until 1996 when the current three year BS (1996) and two year MS program (1997) took over.

See also
Siviløkonom

Master's degrees
Academic degrees of Denmark
Academic degrees of Norway
Economics education